Mioawateria aitanga is an extinct species of sea snail, a marine gastropod mollusk in the family Raphitomidae.

Description
The length of the shell attains 8.6 mm, its diameter 4.8 mm.

Distribution
Fossils of this marine species were found in New Zealand
.

References

 Maxwell, P.A. (2009). Cenozoic Mollusca. pp 232–254 in Gordon, D.P. (ed.) New Zealand inventory of biodiversity. Volume one. Kingdom Animalia: Radiata, Lophotrochozoa, Deuterostomia. Canterbury University Press, Christchurch..

External links
 Grant-Mackie, J. A., and M. Chapman-Smith. "Paleontological notes on the Castlecliffian Te Piki bed, with descriptions of new molluscan taxa." New Zealand journal of geology and geophysics 14.4 (1971): 655-704

aitanga
Gastropods described in 1971
Gastropods of New Zealand